KSAT-2, also known as Hayato-2 was a Japanese satellite constructed by Kagoshima University as a reflight of its KSAT mission. It has a size of 10 x 10 x 10 cm (without extendible antenna boom) and is built around a standard 1U CubeSat satellite bus. The primary satellite payload is a radio-frequency water vapor detector for climatology research.

See also 

 List of CubeSats
 KSAT page (KSAT launched 20 May 2010, contact lost 12 days after launch)

References

External links 
 Gunters space KSAT-2 page
 KSAT-2 tracking page

Spacecraft launched in 2014
Spacecraft which reentered in 2014
2014 in Japan
Satellites of Japan
CubeSats